Vicente Vansteenkiste (7 October 1939 ~ 28 April 2021) was an Argentine rower. He competed in the men's coxless four event at the 1960 Summer Olympics.

References

1939 births
Living people
Argentine male rowers
Olympic rowers of Argentina
Rowers at the 1960 Summer Olympics
Sportspeople from Rosario, Santa Fe